Dubrising is a studio album by Jamaican reggae rhythm section and production duo Sly and Robbie. Released on 2 December 2014 through Tabou 1 record label, the album features contributions from keyboardist Dan Donovan of Big Audio Dynamite and audio engineer Paul "Groucho" Smykle, marking their first collaboration in 30 years with the latter.

Critical reception

The album generally received positive reviews from music critics. AllMusic critic David Jeffries thought that the record "plays out cool and tasteful, like old friends who pick right up where they left off decades ago" and "deserves special attention from the dubheads, '80s heads, and the Uhuru faithful." Daniel Sylvester of Exclaim! wrote: "By incorporating modern sounds into their oeuvre, Sly & Robbie strive to stay relevant by weaving the past into the present."

Track listing
 "Satan Fall" – 5:27
 "Freedom Ring" – 4:07
 "Drone Snipers" – 3:46
 "Bully Tactics" – 4:20
 "To The Rescue" – 4:39
 "No Surrender" – 4:45
 "Flame Thrower" – 4:48
 "Dub-ble Agent" – 3:56

Personnel
Album personnel as adapted from album liner notes.
Musicians

Robbie Shakespeare – bass, guitar, keyboards
Sly Dunbar – drums, percussion
Dalton Brownie – guitar 
Willie Lindo – guitar
Darryl Thompson – guitar
Mikey Chung – guitar
Radcliffe "Dougie" Bryan – guitar
Bunny McKenzie – harmonica
Ansel Collins – keyboards
Dan Donovan – keyboards

Franklyn Waul – keyboards
Robbie Lyn – keyboards
Steven "Lenky" Marsden – keyboards
Tyrone Downie – keyboards
Wally Badarou – keyboards
Skully Simms – percussion
Uziah Thompson – percussion
Dean Fraser – saxophone 
Stepper Briard – saxophone
Ronald "Nambo" Robinson – trombone

Technical personnel
Laurent Gudin – artwork
Noah Kuang Hong – illustration
Bruno Sourice – mastering
Paul "Groucho" Smykle – mixing
Guillaume Bougard – production

References

External links
 

2014 albums
Sly and Robbie albums
Albums produced by Sly and Robbie